The River Severn, at  long, is the longest river in Great Britain. The river then flows through Shropshire, Worcestershire and Gloucestershire. The county towns of Shrewsbury and Gloucester and the City of Worcester lie on its course.

The Severn's major tributaries are the Vyrnwy, the Tern, the Teme, the Warwickshire Avon, and the Worcestershire Stour.

By convention, the River Severn is usually considered to end, and the Severn Estuary to begin, after the Second Severn Crossing, between Severn Beach in South Gloucestershire and Sudbrook, Monmouthshire. That figure excludes the area of the River Wye and the Bristol Avon, both of which flow into the Severn Estuary. The Estuary discharges into the Bristol Channel, which opens into the Celtic Sea and from there into the Atlantic Ocean.

Etymology and mythology
The name Severn is thought to derive from a British *sabrinā, possibly from an older form  *samarosina, meaning "land of summertime fallow”.
The name is recorded in the Latinized form Sabrina in the 2nd century.

Milton's 1634 masque Comus makes Sabrina a nymph who had drowned in the river.
In Shrewsbury, there is now a statue of Sabrina in the Dingle Gardens at the Quarry, as well as a metal sculpture erected in 2013.

There is a different deity associated with the Severn Estuary: Nodens, represented as mounted on a seahorse,  riding on the crest of the Severn bore.

Geography and geology

The River Severn's current form is the result of a multi-million year history and complex underlying geology but is in part the result of glaciation during the last ice age in the Pleistocene epoch of the Quaternary period. Within Wales, the river runs through a landscape formed in Ordovician and Silurian rocks. As it enters the Shropshire Plain, these lower Palaeozoic rocks are replaced by Permian and Triassic age strata though largely unseen beneath a thick cover of Quaternary deposits. Certain stretches also run across Carboniferous strata as at Shrewsbury and for much of the distance between Ironbridge and Bewdley. Permo-Triassic bedrock then continues until the Severn moves intermittently onto the Jurassic outcrop from Tewkesbury southwards. Only in the SSW-NNE aligned valley either side of Welshpool is there any obvious relationship to geological structure; the valley follows the lines of the Severn Valley Faults. For much of the rest of its course it runs directly across  geological structures.

It was first proposed in the 1900s that the former northerly course of the upper Severn was disrupted during the course of the ice age by the blocking of its access to the Irish Sea through Cheshire causing a large lake to develop across much of Shropshire. It was supposed that this lake, named as Lake Lapworth, overtopped its southern margin and rapidly cut down to form the Ironbridge Gorge providing the Severn with a southerly exit to the sea as remains the case today.  An alternative theory which has gained favour in recent years does away with Lake Lapworth, suggesting that the upper Severn flowed beneath the icesheet in a bedrock hollow known as the Severn Trench eastwards from Melverley to the Ironbridge Gorge. It is possible that the trench and gorge were cut over successive ice ages.

Tributary rivers
Over its length, there are a large number of tributaries, but the three largest feeding the non-tidal river are the Vyrnwy, the Teme and the Warwickshire Avon. The Wye, the Bristol Avon and the Usk all flow into the estuarine section of the Severn. The main tributaries are described in sequence below.

The first tributary of significance is the Afon Dulas, joining from the south immediately upstream of Llanidloes, with the Afon Clywedog joining  in the town. The Afon Cerist, bolstered by the Afon Trannon, and the Afon Carno join as left bank tributaries immediately upstream of Caersws. Mochdre Brook enters on the western edge of Newtown, followed by the Bechan Brook just northeast of the town. The Mule enters at Abermule, and the River Rhiw east of Berriew, followed shortly by the Camlad which rises above Churchstoke and by the Luggy Brook. The left bank Sylfaen Brook enters at Welshpool, and the Bele Brook via the New Cut east of Arddlin.

The River Vyrnwy, which begins at Lake Vyrnwy, flows eastwards through Powys, gathering the waters of the Banwy, Cain and Tanat, before forming part of the border between England and Wales, and joining the Severn near Melverley, Shropshire. The River Perry joins on the left bank above Shrewsbury, while both the Rad Brook and the Rea Brook, which flows northeast from its source at Marton Pool near the Welsh border, join the Severn within the town. The left bank tributary, the River Tern, after flowing south from Market Drayton and being joined by the River Meese and the River Roden, meets the Severn at Attingham Park.

The River Worfe joins the Severn's left bank just above Bridgnorth, before the Mor, Borle and Dowles brooks join on the opposite bank over the next few miles, the last-named draining Wyre Forest. The River Stour rises in the north of Worcestershire in the Clent Hills, near St Kenelm's Church at Romsley. It flows north into the adjacent West Midlands at Halesowen. It then flows westwards through Cradley Heath and Stourbridge, where it leaves the Black Country. It is joined by the Smestow Brook at Prestwood before it winds around southwards to Kinver, and then flows back into Worcestershire. It then passes through Wolverley, Kidderminster and Wilden to its confluence with the Severn at Stourport-on-Severn. The Dick Brook, Shrawley Brook and Grimley Brook enter on the right bank before the River Salwarpe, which runs through Droitwich enters on the opposite (east) bank.

The River Teme flows eastwards from its source in Mid Wales, straddling the border between Shropshire and Herefordshire; it is joined by the River Onny, River Corve and River Rea before it finally joins the Severn on the southern edge of Worcester. Bushley Brook joins just upstream of the confluence of the Warwickshire Avon with the Severn at Tewkesbury. One of several Avons, this one flows west through Rugby, Warwick and Stratford-upon-Avon. It is then joined by its tributary the River Arrow, before joining the Severn. The rivers Swilgate and Chelt also join the Severn's left bank, as do the Hatherley and Horsbere brooks, before it reaches Gloucester. The River Leadon enters the tidal West Channel of the Severn at Over, immediately west of Gloucester. The River Frome is the second significant tributary to enter the tidal stretch of the Severn, doing so at Framilode. Bideford Brook drains the easternmost part of the Forest of Dean, entering the Severn estuary east of Blakeney. On the opposite (southeast) bank the flow of the River Cam is usurped by the Gloucester and Sharpness Canal before reaching the estuary. The Lyd enters the west bank of the estuary at Lydney Harbour, opposite the place where Berkeley Pill carries the waters of the Little Avon River into it. The final tributary before the Severn Bridge is the collection of streams which enter via Oldbury Pill.

The River Wye, from its source in Plynlimon in Wales ( from the source of the Severn), flows generally south east through the Welsh towns of Rhayader and Builth Wells. It enters Herefordshire, flows through Hereford, and is shortly afterwards joined by the River Lugg, before flowing through Ross-on-Wye and Monmouth, and then southwards where it forms part of the boundary between England (Forest of Dean) and Wales. It flows into the Severn estuary south of the town of Chepstow.

The Mounton Brook and Nedern brooks enter on the Monmouthshire side between the two motorway crossings. The Port of Bristol is on the Severn Estuary, where another River Avon flows into it through the Avon Gorge. The River Usk and the Ebbw River flow into the Severn Estuary at Uskmouth just south of Newport.

Settlements

The river's course within Wales lies wholly within the county of Powys. The first town it encounters downstream of its source is Llanidloes where it is joined by the Dulas and the Clywedog. It flows past the villages of Llandinam and Caersws before reaching Newtown. It then runs by Abermule and Cilcewydd before flowing beside Welshpool, the last town on its course in Wales.

Entering Shropshire and England, a few villages such as Shrawardine sit back from the river as it meanders eastwards towards the county town of Shrewsbury. More villages, notably Atcham, Wroxeter and Cressage sit beside the river as it turns southeast and heads for the gorge at Ironbridge before turning south for Bridgnorth. The Shropshire villages of Quatford and Hampton Loade and the Worcestershire village of Upper Arley follow, before the Severn runs through Bewdley and Stourport-on-Severn in quick succession. The river then passes the villages of Astley Burf and Holt Fleet before entry into the city of Worcester. Several villages sit back from the river before it runs by Upton-upon-Severn and then enters Gloucestershire as it joins with the Warwickshire Avon outside of Tewkesbury. A few more villages intervene, notable amongst which is Maisemore before the river enters the city of Gloucester from which point it is tidal.

Several more villages sit beside the tidal stretch. Amongst these are Elmore, Epney and Framilode on the east bank and Minsterworth, Broadoak and Newnham on Severn on the west bank.

Transport

Bridges

The Severn is bridged at many places, and many of these bridges are notable in their own right. The Iron Bridge at Ironbridge was the world's first iron arch bridge. Several other bridges crossing the river were designed and built by the engineer Thomas Telford.

The two major road bridges of the Severn crossing link south eastern Wales with the southern counties of England.
Severn Bridge – opened in 1966 carrying what is now the M48
Second Severn Crossing – opened in 1996 carrying the M4 motorway

Prior to the construction of the first bridge in 1966, the channel was crossed by the Aust Ferry.

Other notable bridges include:

 Buttington Bridge – built in 1872
 Montford Bridge – Thomas Telford's first ever bridge design, built between 1790 and 1792
 Welsh Bridge – in the centre of Shrewsbury, built in 1795 at a cost of £8,000
 English Bridge – also in Shrewsbury, designed and completed in 1774 by John Gwynn
 Atcham Bridges – the old one built in 1774, while the newer one in 1929 carries the B4380
 Albert Edward Bridge – in Coalbrookdale, a railway bridge opened in 1864
 Coalport Bridge – like its neighbour Ironbridge, is made of cast iron, built in 1818
 Victoria Bridge  – designed by John Fowler, opened in 1862. Still in use by the Severn Valley Railway
 Bewdley Bridge – designed by Telford, completed in 1798
 Holt Fleet Bridge – in Worcestershire and designed by Telford and opened in 1828
 Upton Town Bridge – built in 1940, the only bridge to cross between Worcester and Tewkesbury
 Queenshill Viaduct – carries the M50 between Junction 1 and 2
 Mythe Bridge – designed by Telford and opened in April 1826, located in Tewkesbury
 Haw Bridge – a steel beam bridge, west of Tewkesbury
 Maisemore Bridge – carries the A417 and is a single masonry arch, dating back to 1230.
 Over Bridge – single masonry arch, built by Telford
 Severn Rail Bridge – linking the Forest of Dean to Sharpness docks, partially collapsed in 1960 and was dismantled in 1967–70

Rail
The Severn Tunnel, completed in 1886 by John Hawkshaw on behalf of the Great Western Railway, lies near the Second Severn Crossing road bridge, and carries the South Wales Main Line section of the Great Western Main Line under the channel. The original line built before the Severn Tunnel was the South Wales Railway from Gloucester, that followed the estuary alongside present day stations of Lydney, Chepstow, Caldicot and Severn Tunnel Junction to Newport.

Cars could also be transported through the Severn Tunnel. In the 1950s three trains a day made round trips between Severn Tunnel Junction and Pilning. The vehicles were loaded onto open flat bed carriages and pulled by a small pannier tank locomotive, although sometimes they were joined to a scheduled passenger train. The prudent owner paid to cover the vehicle with a sheet, as sparks often flew when the steam locomotive tackled the slope leading to the tunnel exit. A railway coach was provided for passengers and drivers. Reservations could be made and the fee for the car was about thirty shillings (£1.50) in the early 1950s.

Disasters

There have been many disasters on the Severn, which have claimed perhaps 300 lives, depending on sources, especially during the 20th century. The Severn Railway Bridge was badly damaged by the collision of two river barges in 1960, which led to its demolition in 1970. Five crew members of both the Arkendale H and Wastdale H died in the accident. There have been frequent floods in Shrewsbury, Bewdley and elsewhere. More recently the river flooded during the 2007 United Kingdom floods and the 2019–20 United Kingdom floods.

Navigation

There is a public right of navigation between Pool Quay, near Welshpool, and Stourport. However this stretch of the river has little traffic, other than small boats, canoes and some tour boats in Shrewsbury. Below Stourport, where the river is more navigable for larger craft, users must obtain permits from the Canal & River Trust, who are the navigation authority. During spring freshet the river can be closed to navigation.

At Upper Parting above Gloucester, the river divides into two, and flows either side of Alney Island to Lower Parting. The West Channel is no longer navigable. The East Channel is navigable as far as Gloucester Docks, from where the Gloucester and Sharpness Canal provides a navigable channel south. Between the docks and Lower Parting Llanthony Weir marks the Normal Tidal Limit (NTL) of the East Channel of the river.

In the tidal section of the river below Gloucester, the Gloucester Harbour Trustees are the competent harbour authority. The Trustees maintain navigation lights at various points along the river (including on Chapel Rock and Lyde Rock, and leading lights at Slime Road, Sheperdine and Berkeley Pill).

Locks
There are locks on the lower Severn to enable seagoing boats to reach as far as Stourport.

Associated canals

The Staffordshire and Worcestershire Canal, the Worcester and Birmingham Canal, (both narrow beam) and the Herefordshire and Gloucestershire Canal join the Severn at Stourport, Worcester and Gloucester respectively. The Droitwich Barge Canal, a broad beam canal, joins the Severn at Hawford, near to the River Salwarpe, and connects to the Droitwich Canal (narrow beam) in the name town, which then forms a link to the Worcester and Birmingham Canal. The two Droitwich canals re-opened in 2010 after major restoration.

The Gloucester and Sharpness Canal connects the Severn at Gloucester to the Severn at Sharpness, avoiding a stretch of the tidal river which is dangerous to navigate. The Stroudwater Navigation used to join the tidal Severn at Framilode, but since the 1920s has connected to the Severn only via the Gloucester and Sharpness Canal.

The Lydney Canal is a short canal which connects Lydney to the river.

The section of the river between Tewkesbury and Worcester forms part of the Avon Ring, a  circular cruising route which includes 129 locks and covers parts of three other waterways.

Passenger transport

The tidal river
Paddle steamers were operated in the Severn Estuary from the mid 19th century to the late 1970s by P & A Campbell of Bristol. The vessels, Cardiff Queen, Bristol Queen, Glen Usk, Glen Gower and Britannia all operated on this route in the 1950s and 1960s.  Since 1986 Waverley Excursions has operated occasional sailings to Sharpness and Lydney by the MV Balmoral.

A number of ferries were also operated on the tidal river, for example at New Passage, Purton and Arlingham. The last ferry was the Aust Ferry, which closed in 1966 when the Severn Bridge opened. One of the Aust ferries, Severn Princess, is still in Chepstow although largely derelict.

The upper river

In Worcester, the Worcester River Cruises have boat trips up and down the river between Tewkesbury and Stourport, operating the boats The Pride of the Midlands and The Earl Grosvenor.

The Cathedral Ferry, a foot passenger ferry, also operates on summer weekends from the steps of Worcester Cathedral.

In Shropshire the Hampton Loade Ferry used to operate across the river though has been closed since 2016.

In Shrewsbury, boat trips around the loop of the town centre are at present provided by the Sabrina and depart from Victoria Quay near the Welsh Bridge during the summer.

Severn Estuary

The river becomes tidal close to Maisemore, on the West Channel just north of Gloucester, and at Llanthony Weir on the East Channel. The tidal river downstream from Gloucester is sometimes referred to as the Severn Estuary, but the river is usually considered to become the Severn Estuary after the Second Severn Crossing near Severn Beach, South Gloucestershire (the point to which the jurisdiction of the Gloucester Harbour Trustees extends), or at Aust, the site of the Severn Bridge.

The Severn Estuary extends to a line from Lavernock Point (south of Cardiff) to Sand Point near Weston-super-Mare. West of this line is the Bristol Channel. In the Severn Estuary (or the Bristol Channel in the last two cases, depending where the boundary is drawn) are the rocky islands called Denny Island, Steep Holm and Flat Holm.

Severn Sea

Until Tudor times the Bristol Channel was known as the Severn Sea, and it is still known as this in both Welsh and Cornish (Môr Hafren and Mor Havren respectively, with môr meaning sea).

Severn bore

A phenomenon associated with the lower reaches of the Severn is the tidal bore, which forms upstream of the port of Sharpness.

It is frequently asserted that the river's estuary, which empties into the Bristol Channel, has the second largest tidal range in the world—, exceeded only by the Bay of Fundy. However a tidal range greater than that of the Severn is recorded from the lesser known Ungava Bay in Canada. During the highest tides, the rising water is funnelled up the Severn estuary into a wave that travels rapidly upstream against the river current. The largest bores occur in spring, but smaller ones can be seen throughout the year. The bore is accompanied by a rapid rise in water level which continues for about one and a half hours after the bore has passed.

Industry
A  stretch of the River Severn in Shropshire, is known as Ironbridge Gorge. It was designated a World Heritage Site by UNESCO in 1986. Its historic importance is due to its role as the centre of the iron industry in the early stages of the Industrial Revolution. The gorge and the village of Ironbridge get their name from the Iron Bridge across the Severn, built in 1779, which was the first cast-iron arch bridge ever constructed.

Two nuclear power stations are situated on the river, in the area of South Gloucestershire. Oldbury Nuclear Power Station and Berkeley Nuclear Power Station both made use of the River Severn as part of the power generation and nuclear cooling processes.  Both are now decommissioned.

Wildlife
The sides of the estuary are also important feeding grounds for waders, notably at the Bridgwater Bay National Nature Reserve and the Slimbridge Wildfowl Trust. River shingle habitat can also be found on the lower estuary, notable for its population of the endangered 5-spot Ladybird.

Before the installation of the weirs, sturgeon and grey seals would regularly reach as far upstream as Worcester. In the winter of 2011/2012 a female grey seal spent several weeks on the river in Bewdley. The same individual was seen at and around Worcester from October to December 2013.

The river forms part of the Severn-Trent flyway, a route used by migratory birds to cross Great Britain.

Literary and musical allusions 
The River Severn is named several times in A. E. Housman's A Shropshire Lad (1896): "It dawns in Asia, tombstones show/And Shropshire names are read;/And the Nile spills his overflow/Beside the Severn's dead" (“1887"); "Severn stream" (“The Welsh Marches"); and "Severn shore" (“Westward from the high-hilled plain...”).

In Shakespeare's Henry IV, Part 1, Henry "Hotspur" Percy recalls the valour of Edmund Mortimer, 5th Earl of March in a long battle against Welshman Owain Glyndŵr upon the banks of the Severn, claiming the flooding Severn "affrighted with [the warriors'] bloody looks ran fearfully among the trembling reeds and hid his crisp head in the hollow bank, bloodstained with these valiant combatants."

The Severn was the inspiration for a number of works by Gloucestershire composer Ivor Gurney, including the songs "Western Sailors" (1925) and "Severn Meadows" (1917).

Gloucestershire writer and poet Brian Waters published Severn Tide with J. M. Dent in 1947 and followed it with Severn Stream in 1949. With anecdotal stories about his travels, both books tell of  the lives of the people who lived and worked on and along the river, describing the landscape with a poet's eye. Waters links Nodens with the Severn Bore and the association of the Celtic deity with the river is explored at length by Rogers.

Several 20th-century English composers wrote works inspired by the river. Gerald Finzi (1901-1956) wrote A Severn Rhapsody, his Opus 3, in 1923; taking the Severn River and its surrounding countryside as his inspiration. Edward Elgar (1857-1934) wrote The Severn Suite, Opus 87, in 1930. Elgar lived much of both his early life and his later life near Worcester, through which the Severn runs. Herbert Howells (1892-1983), born close to the Severn in Lydney, wrote the complex Missa Sabrinensis (Mass of the Severn) in 1954, and an earlier hymn tune simply entitled Severn.

The Severn is often mentioned in Ellis Peters' The Cadfael Chronicles, set in or around Shrewsbury Abbey, beside the river.

In Julian Barnes' 2011 novel, The Sense of an Ending, Tony, the main character, recalls "a river rushing nonsensically upstream, its wave and wash lit by half a dozen chasing torchbeams," an allusion to a visit to the Severn Bore.

In the song "The Last Bristolian Pirate" by The Longest Johns, a disgruntled farmer decides to become a pirate on the Severn, attacking innocent travellers down the river.

See also

 List of crossings of the River Severn
 List of rivers of England and List of rivers of Wales, between them recording all main tributaries
 The Severn Way long-distance footpath
 The Severn Area Rescue Association operates search and rescue services and lifeboats from Wyre Forest to Beachley (4 stations on the river)
 Mercia Inshore Search and Rescue are based at Upton-upon-Severn
 The Severn Valley, an area straddling Shropshire and Worcestershire
 Severnside, a term with various uses
 Seven Natural Wonders – 2005 TV programme where the river was described as one of the wonders of the West Country.
 Stourport Ring
 South Herefordshire and Over Severn - National Character Area

References

External links

Severn Estuary Partnership
Portishead and Bristol Lifeboat
  ITV Local footage ITV's Keith Wilkinson and Jennifer Binns canoeing the Severn
Woodend, a hamlet washed away by the River Severn
Canal & River Trust official site

 
River Severn
River Severn
 
Rivers of Bristol
Rivers of Cardiff
Rivers of Gloucestershire
Rivers of Monmouthshire
Rivers of Newport, Wales
Rivers of Powys
Rivers of Shropshire
Rivers of Somerset
Rivers of the Vale of Glamorgan
Rivers of Worcestershire
River navigations in the United Kingdom
River Severn